Serdar Kesimal (born 24 January 1989) is a Turkish footballer who plays as a centre back. Kesimal is also a youth international, having been capped at the U-20 and U-21 levels.

Early years
Kesimal was born in Wuppertal on 24 January 1989 to emigrants of Rize. He began his footballing career with amateur club FC Dönberg. He spent some time with Wuppertaler SV before being transferred to FC Köln in 2007. Kesimal played in the U-19 and II teams of.

Career
FC Köln before Kayserispor transferred him in 2009. He scored his first goal for the club in a match against MKE Ankaragücü on 24 August 2010. He made his debut in the 1-0 friendly beat by the Netherlands on November 10, 2010. And he made his debut as an official in 2-0 victory over Austria on March 29, 2011. Kesimal was transferred to Turkish champions Fenerbahçe for Gökhan Ünal plus a fee worth €5 million on a 5-year contract. Following a three-month injury period he returned to the team and quickly gained a starter position in December, 2011. He retired from playing in 2017, as a member of Akhisar Belediye.

International career
Kesimal began his international career with the Turkey U-21 squad. Kesimal was never capped at youth international level. He made his debut against Netherlands on 17 November 2010.

References

1989 births
Living people
Turkish footballers
Turkey international footballers
Turkey under-21 international footballers
Turkey youth international footballers
German footballers
German people of Turkish descent
Wuppertaler SV players
1. FC Köln II players
Kayserispor footballers
Fenerbahçe S.K. footballers
Süper Lig players
Association football central defenders
Association football defenders
Sportspeople from Wuppertal
Footballers from North Rhine-Westphalia